Systematik Ruin is an EP by Mentallo & The Fixer, released on January 12, 1999 by Metropolis Records. It contained remixes and previously unreleased songs from the Algorythum recording sessions. It represented the band's first album without founding member Dwayne Dassing, who left the band in 1998.

Reception

AllMusic gave Systematik Ruin two and a half out of five possible stars.

Track listing

Personnel
Adapted from the Systematik Ruin liner notes.

Mentallo & The Fixer
 Gary Dassing (as Mentallo) – vocals, synthesizer, sampler, effects, tape, electric guitar, acoustic guitar, drum programming, sequencing, programming, mastering, recording, engineering, remixer

Additional musicians
 John Bustamante – backing vocals (1, 3, 4, 6, 9), vocals (2, 5, 7, 8)
 Chris Cline – live drums and recording (1-3, 5, 6, 8)

Production and design
 Carlos Rosales – cover art, design

Release history

References

External links 
 

1999 EPs
Mentallo & The Fixer albums
Metropolis Records EPs
Off Beat (label) EPs